Manuel Ricci (born 25 April 1990) is an Italian footballer who plays as a midfielder for  club Juve Stabia.

Club career
Having come through the youth system of Lazio, Ricci was sent on loan to Monza in 2010 without having played a senior game for his parent club. On 31 August 2011 he was signed by Pergocrema.

On 31 August 2012 he was farmed to Lega Pro Seconda Divisione club Salernitana in a co-ownership deal.

On 21 August 2014 Ricci was signed by Reggiana in a 1-year deal.

On 4 August 2018, he joined Serie C club Matera.

In June 2022, Ricci signed a contract with Juve Stabia.

References 

Living people
1990 births
Italian footballers
S.S. Lazio players
A.C. Monza players
U.S. Pergolettese 1932 players
U.S. Avellino 1912 players
U.S. Salernitana 1919 players
A.C. Reggiana 1919 players
Lupa Roma F.C. players
Matera Calcio players
Potenza Calcio players
S.S. Juve Stabia players
Serie C players
Serie D players
Association football midfielders
Italy youth international footballers